Air Marshal Iain Walter McNicoll,  (born 3 May 1953) is a retired Royal Air Force officer. He was formerly Deputy Commander-in-Chief Operations, RAF Air Command.

RAF career
Educated at the High School of Dundee and the University of Edinburgh, where he gained a Bachelor of Science, and having been in the East Lowlands Universities Air Squadron McNicoll joined the Royal Air Force Flying Branch in 1975.

He was appointed Officer Commanding No. 17(F) Squadron in 1992 and assistant director of Operational Capability at the Ministry of Defence in 1996. He went on to be Personal Staff Officer to the Chief of the Defence Staff in 1997 and Station Commander RAF Brüggen in 1998 in which role had operational control of the base's Tornado aircraft during 1999 NATO bombing of Yugoslavia.

He became Director of Force Development in 2000, Director-General of Joint Doctrine and Concepts in 2002 and Air Officer Commanding No. 2 Group in 2005. His last appointment was as Deputy Commander-in-Chief (Operations) at Air Command in 2007, in which role he had to defend the airworthiness of his ageing aircraft, before he retired in April 2010.

Personal life
He married Wendelien van den Biggelaar, a Dutch citizen, in 1980: they have one son and two daughters.

Reference list

|-

|-

|-

|-

1953 births
Alumni of the University of Edinburgh
Commanders of the Order of the British Empire
Companions of the Order of the Bath
Fellows of the Royal Aeronautical Society
Living people
People educated at the High School of Dundee
Recipients of the Commendation for Valuable Service in the Air
Royal Air Force air marshals